uim (short for "universal input method") is a multilingual input method framework. Applications can use it through so-called bridges.

Supported applications 
uim supports the X Window System legacy XIM (short for X Input Method) through the uim-xim bridge. Many X applications are written in either GTK+ or Qt, which have their own modules dealing with input methods, and uim supports both of these with its GTK+ and Qt immodules.

uim has a bridge for the console (uim-fep), Emacs (uim.el), and macOS (MacUIM).

See also

 Input method
 List of input methods for UNIX platforms

References

External links

 Homepage
 Source code repository
 Mailing list
 Bug tracking system

Freedesktop.org